Papyrus 2 is an early copy of the New Testament in Greek and Coptic. It is a papyrus fragment of a copy of the Gospel of John dating to the sixth century. It is currently housed at the Egyptian Museum, Florence (Inv. no. 7134). There is a portion of Luke 7:22-26.50 in Coptic on the reverse of the fragment.

The fragment appears to be from a lectionary. The text type is a mixed. Aland placed it in Category III.

Name of city ιεροσολυμα (Jerusalem) is given in variation ιερου[σο]λ̣υ̣[μα].

Ermenegildo Pistelli dated the manuscript to the 5th or 6th century; Ernst von Dobschütz to the 6th or 7th century.

See also
 John 12
 List of New Testament papyri
 Luke 7
 New Testament papyrus
 Coptic versions of the Bible

Notes

References
 Aland, Kurt und Barbara Aland. Der Text des Neuen Testaments. Stuttgart: Deutsche Bibelgesellschaft, 1981.
 Maldfeld, Georg and Metzger, Bruce M. "Detailed List of the Greek Papyri of the New Testament," Journal of Biblical Literature Vol. 68, No. 4. (Dec., 1949) pp. 359–370.

External links 
 Kurt Aland and Barbara Aland. The text of the New Testament: an introduction to the critical editions and to the theory and practice of modern textual criticism. Second edition. Translated by Erroll F Rhodes. Grand Rapids, Michigan: William B. Eerdmans Publishing Company, 1989.
 New Testament Transcripts
 GA Papyrus 2. Center for the Study of New Testament Manuscripts
 

Egyptian papyri
Greek-Coptic diglot manuscripts of the New Testament
New Testament papyri
Biblical manuscripts
6th-century biblical manuscripts
National Archaeological Museum, Florence
Gospel of John papyri
Gospel of Luke papyri